Gary Roger Lewis (February 22, 1942 – December 12, 1986) was a professional American football running back in the National Football League. He played seven seasons for the San Francisco 49ers (1964–1969) and the New Orleans Saints (1970). Lewis was one of three 1964 San Francisco 49ers teammates (with Bob Waters and Matt Hazeltine) who died of amyotrophic lateral sclerosis (ALS), also known as Lou Gehrig's disease.

Notes

External links

1942 births
1986 deaths
Players of American football from New Orleans
American football fullbacks
Washington State Cougars football players
Arizona State Sun Devils football players
San Francisco 49ers players
New Orleans Saints players
Neurological disease deaths in the United States
Deaths from motor neuron disease